The following are the squad lists for the countries that played in the 1924 South American Championship held in Uruguay. The participating countries were Argentina, Chile, Paraguay and Uruguay. The teams plays in a single round-robin tournament, earning two points for a win, one point for a draw, and zero points for a loss.

Argentina
Head Coach:  Angel Vázquez

Chile
Head coach:  Carlos Acuña

Paraguay
Head Coach:  Manuel Fleitas Solich

Uruguay
Head Coach:  Enresto Meliante

Notes

References 

Squads
Copa América squads